Doug Allison is an English retired footballer who played as a forward; he is currently the head coach of the Furman University men's soccer team.

Player
In 1984, Allison moved to the United States to attend the University of South Carolina. Between 1984 and 1987, he was a four-year starter on the Gamecocks' soccer team. He led the Gamecocks in scoring each of his four seasons and holds the team's career scoring record with 63 goals and 32 assists for 158 points. He was a 1987 First Team All American and First Team Academic All American.

References

External links
 Furman coaching profile 

1962 births
Living people
All-American men's college soccer players
English footballers
English expatriate footballers
English football managers
Furman Paladins men's soccer coaches
South Carolina Gamecocks men's soccer players
North Carolina Tar Heels men's soccer coaches
Association football forwards
Expatriate soccer players in the United States
English expatriate sportspeople in the United States
English expatriate football managers
Expatriate soccer managers in the United States
South Carolina Gamecocks men's soccer coaches
Sportspeople from Bath, Somerset